Latvia replaced its previous currency, the lats, with the euro on 1 January 2014, after a European Union (EU) assessment in June 2013 asserted that the country had met all convergence criteria necessary for euro adoption.
The adoption process began 1 May 2004, when Latvia joined the European Union, entering the EU's Economic and Monetary Union. At the start of 2005, the lats was pegged to the euro at Ls 0.702804 = €1, and Latvia joined the European Exchange Rate Mechanism (ERM ll), four months later on 2 May 2005.

History
Latvia's Treaty of Accession to the European Union (EU) obliged it to eventually adopt the euro. Latvia had originally planned to adopt the euro on 1 January 2008, but for various reasons this was subsequently delayed several times. After being elected in 2011, Latvian President Andris Bērziņš announced the official goal was for Latvia to join the eurozone in 2014, saying "personally I'm very optimistic we'll join the euro on 1 January 2014. It's our goal and we are working hard to implement this process." In September 2012, Latvian Prime Minister Valdis Dombrovskis reiterated that "Latvia is on track for 2014 and permission to join would be sought in 2013."

Convergence
Before Latvia could adopt the euro, it had to meet five convergence criteria set by the EU. An assessment by the European Central Bank (ECB) in April 2012 found that Latvia met three of the five criteria. The Latvian Finance Minister announced in December 2012 that since convergence checks were only conducted biennially, an extraordinary report would be requested in February 2013, but in January 2013 Prime Minister Dombrovskis stated that for "technical reasons" the request had been delayed until March. However, he was confident that Latvia was "fulfilling the Maastricht euro adoption criteria with a considerable reserve, therefore I don't see any basis on which this convergence report would be negative." The Latvian government formally applied for a convergence check at the beginning of March, and the resulting convergence report, published on 5 June 2013 by the European Commission, concluded that "the Commission considers that Latvia fulfils the conditions for the adoption of the euro." The ECB simultaneously published a report which noted that "Latvia is within the reference values of the convergence criteria". Latvia's adoption of the euro, a legal obligation now that the convergence criteria have been met, was given final approval by the Economic and Financial Affairs Council on 9 July, and the lats was replaced with the euro on 1 January 2014. The Euro switchover ceremony took place at a site where Latvia's crisis began – the former headquarters of the collapsed Parex bank, now headquarters of state-owned Citatele bank, which emerged from Parex's ruins.

Status

Failed calls for a referendum
Some members of Latvia's parliament, the Saeima, originally pushed for a referendum on euro adoption, but Latvian Prime Minister Valdis Dombrovskis argued that a referendum is unnecessary because Latvians already voted in favour of their EU accession treaty in 2003, which binds them to adopt the euro as soon as the country is found to comply with all the convergence criteria. He argued that, given the legal obligation, a referendum could only serve to delay or prevent euro adoption. According to Latvian law, if more than 1/3 of all members of parliament object to a bill, and propose an alternative bill within two weeks of the original bill being passed by parliament, a referendum can be called to allow the public to decide between the two bills. On 31 January 2013, the Latvian parliament passed its "euro adoption bill". Four days later, the biggest opposition party, Harmony Center, stated that it would not support the alternative "referendum bill", which was tabled by the other opposition party, Union of Greens and Farmers. Shortly after this, on 9 February, the referendum proposal had only gathered the support of 4 out of the Saeima's 100 members. These MPs stated that they would turn to the last remaining legal option to force a referendum: gathering a petition of at least 30,000 electoral signatories. Latvia officially requested an extraordinary convergence report to assess their readiness for euro adoption on 4 March 2013. Latvia's Central Election Commission rejected the proposed referendum on 18 March, as the proposed bill was considered not to comply with the Latvian constitution or Latvia's international obligations.

Roadmap for euro adoption
A draft law outlining the euro switchover process was presented by the government's cabinet on 6 November 2012. It specified that:
 ATMs would stop distributing Lats from 1 January 2014.
 Both Lats and Euros would be in circulation for two weeks.
 Post offices would offer free exchange for a month (this was later extended to three months).
 All shops would be required to have dual price displays for three months before and until six months after the adoption.
The law was passed on 31 January 2013.

Linguistic issues

The Latvian Parliament adopted on 26 July 2005 "Regulation Nr.564", outlining that the official Latvian name of the euro currency would be "eiro". In December 2007 the regulation was amended, so that the name in all legal matters would be "euro" and in all non-legal matters "eiro". The ECB was asked to approve this special naming convention, but declined on 13 November 2012 and asked Latvia to repeal either the entire regulation or at least the paragraph that granted the euro currency a special Latvian name. On 4 March 2013, the Latvian Ministry of Justice clarified that while the official name of the currency for all financial and legal documents shall be "euro", the public will continue to be able to use the Latvian name "eiro", furthermore it is required to write "euro" in italics indicating the word is in a foreign language.

Latvian euro design
Latvian euro coins feature three separate designs on the national side, which were publicised in July 2006 on the home page of the National Bank of Latvia. The designs featured were the Latvian maiden, which was featured on the 5 lats coin prior to World War II, on the 1 and 2 euro coins, the greater coat of arms of Latvia on the 10, 20 and 50-cent coins, and the lesser Coat of arms of Latvia on the 1, 2 and 5-cent coins. Originally, it was planned that the Freedom Monument would be featured on the 2 euro coin, but the original design did not meet the regulations of the ECB since it reached out into the ring of the coin and changed one of the stars. Latvia decided that a changed design of the monument would not be as recognisable and decided to use the Latvian maiden, used on the 1 euro coin, on the 2 euro coin as well.

For the design of images on the common side and a detailed description of the coins, see euro coins.

A tender for minting the Latvian euro coins began on 20 September 2012. On 10 December 2012, it was announced that Latvia will utilise the Baden-Württemberg Mint. The coins were minted in Stuttgart except the 1 cent, 10 cent and 1 euro coins, which were minted in Karlsruhe. The production of Latvian euros began in July 2013.

Latvian Historical Regions series

Circulating mintage quantities

Mints
2014: Germany (Stuttgart): 2 cent, 5 cent, 20 cent, 50 cent, 2 euro.
2014: Germany (Karlsruhe): 1 cent, 10 cent, 1 euro.
2015-2018: Germany (Stuttgart)

Notes

References

External links

European Central Bank – Latvia
 Eiro.lv – the euro changeover site (Ministry of Finance of Latvia)
 Bank of Latvia
 EU and euro
 The Euro Information Website – Latvia
 BaltCoin.lv - International purchase of latvian Euro coins

Euro coins by issuing country
2014 in Latvia
Euro coins
Euro